FLOAT Shuttle that means Fly Over All Traffic is a Californian start-up commuter airline based in Pomona. The airline was founded by Arnel Guiang, Tom Hsieh, and Rob McKinney. The company offers a subscription service allowing customers to travel on daily flights between various general aviation airports in the Los Angeles area. 

Flights are planned to be operated by Southern Airways Express with Cessna Grand Caravan aircraft in a 9-passenger configuration. In August 2020 FLOAT completed the purchase of the remaining assets of Ravn Alaska, which declared bankruptcy earlier in the year.

Fleet
Cessna Grand Caravan operated by Southern Airways Express on behalf of FLOAT Shuttle

Destinations
Camarillo
Carisbad
Compton
Corona
El Monte
Fullerton
Hawthorne
Pomona
Torrance
San Fernando

References

External links 
 Official website

Charter airlines of the United States
Airlines based in California
Subscription services